Gyllene Tider (also known as den gula EP:n, Billy-EP:n), is a promo EP from Swedish pop group Gyllene Tider, released in November 1978 and released in 900 copies. It should not be confused with the Gyllene Tider EP, which was released in 1996.

It was the EP they sent to many different labels and they got a contract with EMI. It has later been released as a bonus record for the CD edition of the album Gyllene Tider.

Track listing

Side A
"Pornografi"
"M"

Side B
"Billy"
"Rembrandt"
"När alla vännerna gått hem"

"Billy" was re-recorded and re-released on their first album, Gyllene Tider. "När alla vännerna gått hem" was recorded for and re-released on Gyllene Tider's second LP Moderna Tider.

1978 EPs